Murua, or Murúa is a Basque surname. Notable people with the surname include:

Ainhoa Murua Ugarte(c.1979-c.2012), PhD Researcher in University of the Basque Country - NanoBioCel
Ainhoa Murua
Fray Martin de Murua (c.1525-c.1618), Mercedarian missionary to colonial Peru and author of Historia general del Piru (1616)
Lautaro Murúa - Chilean film actor.
Michelle Murùa

Geography
Murua Rural LLG in Papua New Guinea
name variant of Woodlark Island

References

Basque-language surnames